WIBF is a country music formatted radio station licensed to Mexico, Pennsylvania serving the Lewistown, Pennsylvania, market. The station is owned by Kristin Cantrell, through licensee Southern Belle, LLC.

WIBF is a member of the Motor Racing Network and provides live coverage of all NASCAR races. WIBF also features locally produced racing programs with news and results from Central Pennsylvania Sprint car racing.

On September 1, 2015, WJUN-FM changed their call letters to WIBF and rebranded as "Bigfoot Country". It is part of a simulcast with WDBF of Mount Union.  Although also owned by Seven Mountains Media, WIBF and WDBF do not feature the same programming as the network of Bigfoot Country stations based in Selinsgrove.

See also
 WDBF-FM

External links

IBF
Country radio stations in the United States
Radio stations established in 1982
1982 establishments in Pennsylvania